Tomás O'Connor (born 13 May 1955 in Walsh Island, County Offaly) is an Irish former sportsperson. He played Gaelic football with his local club Walsh Island and was a member of the Offaly senior inter-county team from 1978 until 1986.

References

1958 births
Living people
Offaly inter-county Gaelic footballers
Walsh Island Gaelic footballers
Winners of one All-Ireland medal (Gaelic football)